The Miss International France is a beauty pageant which selects Miss France to the Miss International pageant.

History
France was debuted at the Miss International beauty pageant in 1960 by Miss France contest. Along with French representatives for Miss Universe and Miss World, Miss France for Miss International also became the most prestigious title at the Miss France contest. In 1976 Miss France 1975, Sophie Perin won Miss International 1976 in Tokyo, Japan. Between 1960 and 2015 French representatives at the Miss International were selected by runner-up Miss France, Miss National, and Miss Prestige National contests.

In 2016 France comes from Katia Maes directorship in Miss International history. The winner of Miss International France may come at the Miss International beauty pageant, which mostly happens in Japan. The reigning title is expected to serve as Ambassador of Peace in France. In 2017, a new French organisation with Bruno Lestienne as national director, with the help from Katia Maes, will organise the first Miss International Contest in september 2017.

Titleholders

Miss International France
Color key

France's Delegates 1960-2015

References

External links
 Miss International France - Site officiel
 missitems.be
 Miss International France page officielle sur Facebook
 Miss International France page officielle sur Instagram

Beauty pageants in France
Recurring events established in 2016
French awards